The Spartan Arrow is a British two-seat biplane aircraft of the early 1930s, built by Spartan Aircraft Limited.

History
Built as a successor to the company's first design the Simmonds Spartan, the Arrow was a two-seat biplane with a spruce and plywood fuselage. The prototype G-AAWY first flew in May 1930 with Cirrus Hermes II engine. The 13 production aircraft that followed used mainly the de Havilland Gipsy II engine.

One aircraft, G-ABBE, was fitted with floats and evaluated as a seaplane in 1931, it was converted back to a landplane and later sold in New Zealand, where it was renumbered as ZK-ACQ.
A second aircraft, G-ABHD, was sold to Australia where it was renumbered as VH-UQD.
A third aircraft, G-ACHG, was sold to Denmark where it was renumbered as OY-DUK.

One aircraft G-ABST was built to test a new air-cooled Napier engine (later knowns as the Javelin). The second prototype G-AAWY was also used by Cirrus Aero Engines as an engine test bed. Production of the Arrow ended in 1933.

Production
Two prototypes and 13 production aircraft were built at Weston, Southampton, and after 20 February 1931 at East Cowes, Isle of Wight.

 Tail Number	    Model     Serial      Location
  G-AAWY		Spartan Arrow	51	United Kingdom
  G-AAWZ		Spartan Arrow	52	United Kingdom
  G-ABBE		Spartan Arrow	75	United Kingdom
  K-ACQ		Spartan Arrow	75	 New Zealand
  G-ABKL		Spartan Arrow	76	United Kingdom
  G-ABGW		Spartan Arrow	77	United Kingdom
  G-ABWP		Spartan Arrow	78	United Kingdom
  G-ABWR		Spartan Arrow	79	United Kingdom
  G-ABHD		Spartan Arrow	80	United Kingdom
  VH-UQD		Spartan Arrow	80	  Australia
  G-ABHR		Spartan Arrow	81	United Kingdom
  G-ABMK		Spartan Arrow	82	United Kingdom
  G-ABOB		Spartan Arrow	83	United Kingdom
  G-ACHE		Spartan Arrow	84	United Kingdom
  G-ACHF		Spartan Arrow	85	United Kingdom
  G-ACHG		Spartan Arrow	86	United Kingdom
  OY-DUK		Spartan Arrow	86	   Denmark
  G-ABST		Spartan Arrow	87	United Kingdom

Survivors
G-ABWP a Cirrus Hermes II powered Arrow (constructor's number 78) survives in flying condition based at Redhill Aerodrome in England.

Operators
The aircraft was operated by flying clubs and private individuals:

Specifications

Notes

References

External links

Simmonds/ Spartan Aircraft
The Spartan "Arrow". A New Two-Seater with Good Climb. in Flight, 7 November 1930.

1930s British civil utility aircraft
Arrow
Biplanes
Single-engined tractor aircraft
Aircraft first flown in 1930